Best of the Vanguard Years is an album by American folk musician Ramblin' Jack Elliott, released in 2000.

The 1964 Vanguard release Jack Elliott is included in its entirety. Seven tracks from Jack Elliott were also reissued on CD by Vanguard in 2007 on Vanguard Visionaries. More than half of the album includes songs that had not been previously released.

Bob Dylan appears playing harmonica as "Tedham Porterhouse".

Reception

Writing for Allmusic, music critic Ronnie D. Lankford Jr. wrote of the album "... even his older material never strikes the listener as out-of-date... For those who want to dig a little deeper into folk music's past, this is a fine selection; for those who aren't familiar with Rambin' Jack Elliott, this is a great place to begin one's acquaintance."

Track listing 
All songs Traditional unless otherwise noted.
"Roving Gambler" – 3:35
"Will the Circle Be Unbroken" – 2:37
"Diamond Joe" – 2:58
"Guabi Guabi" (Traditional, Jack Elliott) – 4:43
"Sowing on the Mountain" – 2:15
"Roll on Buddy" – 2:01
"1913 Massacre" (Woody Guthrie) – 3:52
"House of the Rising Sun" – 3:27
"Shade of the Old Apple Tree" – 2:42
"Black Snake Moan" – 3:25
"Portland Town" (Derroll Adams) – 1:59
"More Pretty Girls Than One" – 2:14
"Danville Girl" – 2:53
"John Hardy" – 2:27
"Dark as a Dungeon" (Merle Travis) – 2:53
"Hard Ain't It Hard" (Guthrie) – 2:40
"Don't Think Twice, It's All Right" (Bob Dylan) – 3:16
"I Got A Woman" – 2:33
"Railroad Bill" – 3:57
"I Never Will Marry" – 2:29
"At My Window" – 2:09
"Blue Eyed Elaine" – 2:18
"Wildwood Flower" (Carter) – 2:25
"Ranger's Command" (Guthrie) – 3:32
"Willie Moore" – 2:53

Personnel
Ramblin' Jack Elliott – vocals, harmonica, guitar
Bill Lee – bass
Erik Darling – banjo
John Hammond – mouth harp
Eric Weissberg – bass
John Herald – guitar
Ian Tyson – guitar
Monte Dunn – guitar
Tedham Porterhouse (Bob Dylan) – mouth harp

References

External links
Ramblin' Jack Elliott Discography
Searchin' for a Gem

2000 greatest hits albums
Ramblin' Jack Elliott compilation albums
Vanguard Records compilation albums